Piero Chiara (March 23, 1913 – December 31, 1986) was an Italian writer.

He was born in Luino, on Lake Maggiore (northern Italy). His father Eugenio was from Resuttano, Sicily; his mother Virginia Maffei was from Comnago, a Piedmontese village in the municipality of Lesa. Sought by the Fascist militia during World War II, he fled to Switzerland in 1944. He returned to Italy two years later, starting his writing career. His most famous work is La stanza del vescovo of 1976, which was turned into a film by Dino Risi soon afterwards.

He was married to Jula Sherb of Swiss origin. They had one son Marco Chiara who was married and divorced from Judith Loeb Chiara of the Lehman family. He died in Varese in 1986.

The Disappearance of Signora Giulia was the first of his books to be translated into English.

References

1913 births
1986 deaths
People from the Province of Varese
Italian male writers
People of Sicilian descent
People of Piedmontese descent